Chang Kai-chen and Chuang Chia-jung were the defending champions, but Chuang decided not to participate.
Chang played alongside Shuko Aoyama and successfully defended her title by defeating Janette Husárová and Zhang Shuai in the final, 6–7(4–7), 7–6(7–4), [14–12].

Seeds

Draw

Draw

References
 Main Draw

Malaysian Open - Doubles
2013 Doubles